Ted Emery is an Australian film and television director and producer.

Ted Emery served in the Royal Australian Navy during the Vietnam War. After returning to Australia, he joined the ABC in Melbourne, Australia, and in time became a director and producer for the weekly ABC music program, Countdown.

He continued to work as an assistant director at the ABC on such programs as Power Without Glory, before moving into directing comedy series. He has worked consistently as a director, writer and producer of a number of Australian comedy television series and films, including Fast Forward, Full Frontal and Kath and Kim.

Credits 

Emery was featured in the Molly Meldrum television series, Molly, where his work as a director on Countdown was dramatised. Emery is credited with having helped to save many of the master videotapes of Countdown, including the first episode that was broadcast in colour. A large number of master videotapes recorded at the ABC between 1974 and 1978 were later erased and recycled during a management-initiated "economy drive" at the ABC, an action which Meldrum later criticised and said was "unforgivable" 

Emery moved to Queensland in 2008, and retired from film work by 2015.

References

Australian television directors
Australian television producers
Living people
Year of birth missing (living people)